Jason Thrasher is an American photographer with a special focus on musicians. He was honored for his 2017 book, Athens Potluck,  as  a 2018 Georgia Author of the Year.   His work has been exhibited at the Atlanta  Contemporary Art Center, the Corcoran School of Fine Art in Washington, D.C., the Yerba Buena Arts Center in San Francisco, the Institute of Contemporary Arts (London), the Ogden Museum of Southern Art in New Orleans and the Atrium Gallery at the Hartsfield-Jackson International Airport in Atlanta.

Early life and career
Jason Thrasher is from Huntsville, Alabama. As a young skateboarder he met photographer, J. Grant Brittain from Transworld Skateboarding who was in Huntsville to photograph Regional competitions at Underground Skate Park. Thrasher was inspired to become a photographer and studied at the University of Alabama-Birmingham before moving to Athens, Georgia where he studied and graduated from the University of Georgia. He began photographing musical acts.  His photographs have appeared in Rolling Stone, Spin, Entertainment Weekly and for labels ATO and Warner Brothers.
Jason Thrasher also produces music and documentary videos.

Music photography

In the photography book, Athens Potluck, Jason Thrasher produced a chain  of images and interviews with 33 musicians whose careers were connected to Athens, Georgia. Artists featured include Will Cullen Hart and Julian Koster of the Elephant 6 Collective, Patterson Hood of the Drive-By Truckers, Vanessa Briscoe Hay of  Pylon, and Michael Stipe of R.E.M. The photo essay on  Art Rosenbaum whose album, The Art of Field Recording  won a Grammy Award in 2008 incorporates images of his art and music. An exhibit that featured images from Athens Potluck was held at the Georgia Theatre  where the book is on permanent display.

India Perspectives

The Athens Institute for Contemporary Art exhibition, “Jason Thrasher: Uncovered Perspectives: India 21 Years Later, ”  documents various locations in India before the Internet brought many changes to daily life.  Taken with a Leica camera the 33mm black and white negatives were made clearer using digital techniques.  The exhibit opened October 13, 2019 and included concerts of experimental music.

Publications
Athens Potluck, Deeds Publishing, 2017. .

References

External links

People from Huntsville, Alabama
People from Athens, Georgia
Year of birth missing (living people)
Living people
University of Alabama at Birmingham alumni
21st-century American photographers
University of Georgia alumni
Photographers from Alabama
Photographers from Georgia (U.S. state)
Rock music photographers
Photography in India